The e-Dirham is a payment tool introduced by the government of the United Arab Emirates with the aim of facilitating the collection of revenues of governmental and non-governmental service fees in a safe and secure way.

The e-Dirham was initially intended for use by the UAE federal government, but it was later used by the local governments of the constituent Emirates, as well as by  semi-governmental organizations and private enterprises.

The e-Dirham was launched on 3 February 2001, making UAE the first country within the Arab Region to introduce such a system countrywide.

The e-Dirham has become widely available, and has many payment channels. The Ministry of Finance and Industry has worked and is still working on expanding payment channels. Currently available payment channels include

 Electronic point of sale (EPOS) terminals
 Over the Internet (E-Dirham Payment Gateway)
 E-Stamp

Card Types
The e-Dirham Cards can be described as a Secure Electronic Purse and currently have two versions as per the following:

The Fixed Value Card

The Ministry of Finance and Industry has made available the e-Dirham cards with fixed value for a number of denominations that can be bought at face value from a number of banks (e-Dirham Members).

The current available denominations are AED 100, 200, 300, 500, 1000, 3000 and 5000.

Those cards can’t be re-charged. But an applicant could use up to two cards to settle the fee of any one service he/she is applying for.

The Government Client Card

On 24 June 2001, the Ministry of Finance & Industry has launched a new card named as “Government Client Cards”. This represents the second generation of the e-Dirham.

This card type is intended for frequent users of governmental services, and can be obtained by individuals or companies. The advantage of this card that it is personalized so that no one else could use this card except for the card holder which was originally issued to.

Once issued this card will have a zero value loaded onto it. Then the card holder should go to the nearest e-Dirham member bank to have his/her card filled with any amount of money either by paying cash or through account transfer.

Government Client Card Applications are available at the Ministry of Finance and Industry (Abu Dhabi and Dubai), as well as at the e-Dirham member banks for the individuals and companies to apply for. Once an application is approved then a Government Client Card is personalized and issued along with a PIN arriving in a secure envelope for the cardholder use only.

The PIN will allow the card holder to benefit from various through the 24 hours / 7 days IVR Tele e-Dirham Service (interactive voice response system), as well as through the Internet (Internet e-Dirham Service).

The e-Dirham system was developed and implemented by [ GET Group]]

e-Dirham card point of sale

The e-Dirham Card (with Fixed Face Value)

Cards are available from any of the following e-Dirham member banks (list may not be up to date):

National Bank of  Dubai

Commercial Bank of Dubai

Union National Bank

Mashreq Bank

Abu Dhabi Islamic Bank

Arab Bank for Investment and Foreign Trade
	
Above banks have branches covering the whole country; in addition to that some of the above banks have a special branch situated at some of the ministries for the convenience of the public.

The e-Dirham Government Client Card

Application forms are available at the Ministry of Finance and Industry (Abu Dhabi and Dubai), in addition at any of the branches of the above e-Dirham Member Banks.

Once the application is filled up with complete supporting documents as requested it will be processed by the Ministry of Finance and Industry, once approved a Government Client Card will be personalized with the card holder details and photo and issued with a PIN in a secure envelope.

Then it is the duty of the cardholder to fill any amount of money in the e-Dirham Government Client Card from any of the above-mentioned banks.

Digital currencies
Economy of the United Arab Emirates